West Kootenay-Nelson was an electoral district in the Canadian province of British Columbia from 1898 to 1903.

For other ridings named Kootenay or in the Kootenay region, please see Kootenay (electoral districts).

Demographics

Geography

History

Notable MLAs

Election results 
Note:  Winner of election is in bold.

|-

|- bgcolor="white"
!align="right" colspan=3|Total valid votes
!align="right"|1,548 	
!align="right"|100.00%

For the 1903 election this riding was renamed Nelson City.

Sources 

Elections BC historical returns

Former provincial electoral districts of British Columbia